Fergus Michael Claude Bowes-Lyon, 17th and 4th Earl of Strathmore and Kinghorne (31 December 1928 – 19 August 1987), was a British nobleman and peer. He was a nephew of Queen Elizabeth The Queen Mother (born Elizabeth Bowes-Lyon), and a first cousin of Queen Elizabeth II and Princess Margaret.

He was the son of Capt. The Hon. Michael Claude Hamilton Bowes-Lyon and Elizabeth Margaret Cator. His paternal grandparents were The 14th Earl of Strathmore and Kinghorne and Cecilia Cavendish-Bentinck.

He married Mary Pamela McCorquodale (b.1932) on 10 April 1956. They had three children:
 Michael Fergus Bowes-Lyon, 18th Earl of Strathmore and Kinghorne – (7 June 1957 – 27 February 2016) Married Isobel Weatherall in 1984, divorced in 2005, had issue. Married Damaris Stuart-William in 2005, divorced in 2008, had issue. Married Karen Baxter in 2012.
 Lady Elizabeth Mary Cecilia Bowes-Lyon – (b. 23 December 1959) Married Antony Richard Leeming in 1990. Lady Elizabeth served as a Lady-in-waiting to her cousin, Queen Elizabeth II.
 Lady Diana Evelyn Bowes-Lyon – (b. 29 December 1966) Married Christopher Godfrey-Faussett in 1995. She is a Patroness of the Royal Caledonian Ball.

He inherited the Earldom of Strathmore and Kinghorne upon the death of his first cousin, The 16th Earl of Strathmore and Kinghorne. 
He collapsed while shooting grouse on the grounds of the castle and died en route to a hospital. He was succeeded by his son.

References

Michael Bowes-Lyon, 17th Earl of Strathmore and Kinghorne
Baronesses- and Lords-in-Waiting
17
1928 births
1987 deaths
Earls in the Peerage of the United Kingdom
Deputy Lieutenants of Angus